The president of the Valencian Government is the head of the Generalitat Valenciana, the government of the Spanish autonomous community of Valencia. The president is chosen by the Valencian parliament, the Corts Valencianes.

Election
Under Article 27 of the regional Statute of Autonomy, investiture processes to elect the president of the Valencian Government require of an absolute majority—more than half the votes cast—to be obtained in the first ballot in the Corts Valencianes. If unsuccessful, a new ballot will be held 48 hours later requiring only of a simple majority—more affirmative than negative votes—to succeed. If the proposed candidate is not elected, successive proposals are to be transacted under the same procedure. In the event of the investiture process failing to elect a regional president within a two-month period from the first ballot, the Parliament shall be automatically dissolved and a fresh election called.

Before 2006, the election of the regional president was regulated under Article 15. Until then, the Statute allowed for multiple candidates to be voted, with the one securing the absolute majority in the first ballot, or a simple majority in the second one to be held 48 hours later, being elected to the office.

List of officeholders
Governments:

Timeline

References

External links
Alberto Fabra - President of the Valencia Generalitat